Nicholas Daniel Latifi (born 29 June 1995) is a Canadian racing driver who last raced in Formula One. Latifi made his Formula One debut in the 2020 Austrian Grand Prix and competed with Williams for three full seasons, managing to score nine championship points. Prior to that, he served as a test and reserve driver for Renault, Force India and Williams itself. 

Previously, he finished runner-up in the 2019 Formula 2 Championship with DAMS.

Early life 
Born in Montreal, Latifi grew up in North York, Toronto. He is the son of Michael Latifi, an Iranian-Canadian businessman who is the CEO of Sofina Foods, Inc. and also owns the British Virgin Islands company Nidala. His mother, Marilena Latifi (née Russo), an Italian-Canadian with Sicilian parents, was born into the Saputo family which founded the dairy company Saputo Inc. Latifi has three siblings; Soph, Michael and Matthew.

Junior racing career

Karting 
Latifi began his karting career in 2009, at the relatively late age of 13. In 2010, he finished as the runner-up in the Rotax Junior class of the Canadian National Karting Championship. Latifi continued competing in Canadian and American karting series until 2012, when he won the Florida Winter Tour championship in the Rotax DD2 class. He later made an appearance in the Shifter ROK class of the Florida Winter Tour in 2015, competing against former Formula One drivers Rubens Barrichello and Nelson Piquet Jr.

Formula 3 

Latifi's single-seater debut came in the 2012 Italian Formula Three Championship with BVM. He finished the season in 7th place, having taken one win at the Vallelunga Circuit and three further podium finishes. At the start of the following year, Latifi raced in the 2013 Toyota Racing Series, finishing 9th in the championship with a best finish of 6th at Timaru and scoring points in every race. Latifi then took part in a full season of the FIA Formula 3 European Championship, driving for Carlin. He ended the season in 15th place, his best finishes being two 5th places at Silverstone and the Red Bull Ring. During his European Formula 3 campaign, Latifi also raced in the British Formula 3 International Series, finishing 5th and taking two pole positions along with a podium finish at Brands Hatch. Additionally, he competed in the 2013 Masters of Formula 3 race at Zandvoort, qualifying 8th and finishing 7th.

Latifi continued racing in European Formula 3 in 2014, moving to Prema Powerteam alongside future Formula One competitor Esteban Ocon. Latifi finished 10th in the championship after missing the final round to compete in Formula Renault 3.5, with his best finish being 2nd place at Silverstone. In November 2014 he made his only appearance at the Macau Grand Prix. He qualified 9th, finishing 7th in the qualifying race and then taking 5th place in the main race.

Formula Renault 3.5 
Latifi competed in the final three rounds of the 2014 Formula Renault 3.5 Series for Tech 1 Racing, taking 2nd place in the final race at Jerez and placing 20th in the standings. He then moved to Arden Motorsport and competed in a full season in 2015. He finished the season in 11th place, taking one fastest lap. His best finishes were two 4th places at Spa-Francorchamps and at the Red Bull Ring, to place 11th overall, behind teammate Egor Orudzhev.

Sports car racing 
Latifi competed in the 2012 Continental Tire Sports Car Challenge for Rehagen Racing, driving a Ford Mustang GT. In 2014, he made an appearance in the Porsche Carrera Cup Great Britain driving for Redline Racing at Rockingham. He retired from the first round but scored a 4th-place finish in the second round. He had a longer campaign in 2015, competing in four of the eight rounds and taking 2nd place in the first race at Oulton Park. He finished 11th in the standings.

GP2 Series

2014 
Latifi made his debut in the GP2 Series at the 2014 Yas Marina round where he replaced Daniel Abt at Hilmer Motorsport. He finished the races in 22nd and 17th, placing 32nd in the championship.

2015 
In 2015, Latifi competed in four selected rounds with MP Motorsport, taking over Oliver Rowland's seat. Unfortunately, Latifi could not score any points and had a best finish of 11th during the Bahrain sprint race.

2016 

In 2016, he secured a full-time seat in the series at DAMS alongside Alex Lynn.  He started his season in good fashion, taking second place at the first race in Barcelona, which would be his only podium of the year. He then went on to finish seventh in the sprint race. Despite this strong start, he could manage only two more points finishes during the season. He had a double retirement in Monaco, and a difficult weekend in Baku. His next points would come with tenth place at the first race of the Spielberg round. He came close to points in the Silverstone round, finishing 11th and tenth. In Spa-Francorchamps, Latifi was once again near point, finishing ninth during the sprint race. His next and last points finish of the season would come at the final round in Abu Dhabi, where he finished ninth in the feature race before dropping to 12th in the sprint. Overall, Latifi ended the season in 16th place in the championship with 23 points, ten places and 101 points behind teammate Lynn. DAMS finished fifth in the championship. At the end of the year, Latifi took part in post-season testing remaining with DAMS, and set the fastest lap time.

Formula 2 Championship

2017 

The GP2 Series was re-branded as the Formula 2 Championship for 2017, and Latifi retained his seat at DAMS, now alongside Oliver Rowland. 2017 proved to be a far more successful year for Latifi. In the first round at Bahrain, Latifi scored points in the sprint race with fourth, having missed out on it during the feature race. In Barcelona, Latifi started ninth and finished sixth in the feature race. A good start saw him take the lead of the sprint race on lap 1 and led for much of the race. On lap 22, Latifi made a mistake, running wide through the gravel and allowing Nobuharu Matsushita and teammate Rowland to pass him. Nevertheless, he took his first podium of the year by finishing third and recording the fastest lap. Latifi had an unlucky weekend, retiring with an engine failure in the feature race while running eighth. It took a toll on his sprint race, as he could not rescue points in the sprint race and only finished 13th. Latifi qualified third in Baku, and finished in the same position. Latifi benefitted from collisions and retirements in the sprint race, to end third, capping off a highly successful weekend. Latifi achieved a second place finish in the feature race at the Red Bull Ring. He pitted the earliest of anyone which paid off, and finished only 1.3 seconds behind winner Charles Leclerc. Latifi finished eighth in the sprint race.

In Silverstone, Latifi finished the feature race in eighth. Starting third in the sprint, he drove a commanding race to take victory, marking his first race win in any racing series since 2012. In Budapest, Latifi finished second in the feature race, inheriting a place after Artem Markelov crashed near the end. In the sprint race, he 
finished sixth. Latifi had an unfortunate weekend in Spa-Francorchamps. He was set to second for the feature race, but an engine failure saw the Canadian unable to take the start. From 18th in the sprint race, Latifi pressed on to finish ninth. In Monza, Latifi started only 14th for the feature race but made a supreme charge, climbing places to claim third and another podium in wet conditions. During the sprint race, front wing damage, mistakes and tyre degradation saw him slip to 16th. In Jerez, Latifi finished fourth in the feature race. From fifth in the sprint, he dispatched rivals to move into second place, and stayed there until the end. At the final round in Abu Dhabi Latifi charged from 11th to fifth in the feature race, before ending the season with third place and the fastest lap in the sprint race. Overall, Latifi ended the season 5th place in the championship with 178 points, two places and 13 points behind teammate Rowland. DAMS ended third in the championship. In an article by Motorsport.com, Latifi was ranked 14th of 20 of top junior single-seater drivers of 2017.

2018 

He continued with DAMS in 2018, now partnering future Formula One teammate Alexander Albon in a season that proved less successful than 2017. During the Bahrain opening round, Latifi failed to score points, finishing 11th in the feature race and tenth in the sprint, despite starting from the pit lane in the latter race. In Baku, an issue in qualifying saw Latifi start last in the feature race. Despite that, he carved his way through the field and finished fifth, scoring his first points of the season. Starting fourth in the sprint race, Latifi zoomed into the lead by the first corner. He would soon be passed by Sérgio Sette Câmara, Nyck de Vries and future Formula One teammate George Russell to finish fourth. However, a disqualification from Sette Câmara saw Latifi promoted to third, and score his maiden podium of the year. During the third round in Barcelona, Latifi qualified sixth. However, Latifi stalled at the start of the feature race and was two minutes down the leader by the time he got going. Latifi finished 14th and last in the race, one lap down. In the sprint race, he salvaged a point in eighth place.

Latifi started 18th in Monaco due to an incident-packed qualifying. He battled his way to ninth in the feature race and finished eighth in the sprint race. Latifi started tenth in France in the feature race. He was hit from behind and fell to 17th. However, he put in a storming drive to climb to seventh and score points. Starting second in the sprint race, Latifi fell down the order and contact on the final lap with Lando Norris saw him drop to eighth in the end. At the Red Bull Ring round, Latifi started 19th and finished 11th in the feature race. In the sprint race, Latifi secured a point with eighth place. In Silverstone, Latifi qualified 16th, tyre wear and contact hindered either of his races and he finished 16th and 17th. Latifi had another poor weekend in Hungary, qualifying 14th. He made his way into the top 10 of the feature race, before a broken alternator saw him retire with just a few laps to go. In the sprint race, Latifi soared to 13th from 19th on the opening lap, before contact with the retiring Maximilian Günther saw Latifi make a pit stop and finish 16th.

In Spa-Francorchamps, Latifi started 12th in the feature race and pushed his way to eighth, taking reverse pole for the sprint race. From there, he won the sprint race by ten seconds, taking his only win of the year. Latifi qualified a decent fifth in Monza and finished in the same position in the feature race. He finished one place higher in the sprint race, having started in the same position. In Sochi, Latifi qualified fourth. He made a comeback after his pit stop, and finished second to round out a DAMS 1–2 finish.  He later took 2nd place at the feature race in Sochi. In the sprint race, Latifi sprung from seventh to second by Turn 4, only for Alessio Lorandi to spin him into the wall at the next corner. Latifi had his best qualifying of the year in Yas Marina, qualifying third. However, Latifi stalled on the grid and was collected by Arjun Maini, both their cars massively destroyed. Fortunately, both drivers escaped unhurt. Latifi's car was repaired before the sprint race, only for him to stall again. He finished nearly a lap down in 15th place.  Latifi ended the season in ninth place with 91 points, six places and 121 points behind teammate Albon. He scored a total of three podiums, including one win.

2019 

Latifi remained at DAMS for the fourth consecutive season in 2019, alongside Sérgio Sette Câmara. During the opening Bahrain round, Latifi qualified fourth for the feature race. He moved to third at the start and by lap 9, took the lead of the race. A slow pit stop saw Latifi back down to fourth, but managed to re-pass them back and win his first F2 feature race by nine seconds. In the sprint race, a strong start saw him up to third on the opening lap, and was soon second when Luca Ghiotto pitted. But Ghiotto passed him later in the race and Latifi would finish third. His strong start saw him second in the championship. For the second round in Baku, Latifi qualified in seventh position. In an action-packed race, Latifi finished fourth, having lost out to Jordan King in the final laps. In the sprint race, Latifi quickly worked his way into the lead, taking it from Sean Gelael on lap 6 and never looked back to take victory and the championship lead. In Barcelona, Latifi secured the front row in qualifying. He passed Ghiotto at the start but eventually lost into turn 1 to Guanyu Zhou. With seven laps to go, Latifi reclaimed the lead from Zhou and took his third victory in five races. In the sprint race, Latifi ended sixth. After the first three rounds, Latifi led the championship, 30 points clear of 3rd-placed and eventual title rival Nyck de Vries.

However, Latifi had a poor showing in the fourth round in Monaco, during which Latifi qualified eighth, compunded with a grid penalty. Latifi finished his feature race in 12th, following an incident with Sean Gelael. In the sprint race, Latifi ended tenth, in a track where overtaking was notoriously difficult. He also did set the fastest lap and gained two points. However, De Vries closed the gap to just one point. In France, Latifi secured fifth, after a slow pit stop in the feature race. Latifi finished sixth in the sprint race, having had a slow start. With De Vries winning the feature race, Latifi moved down to second in the championship, trailing by 12 points. In Austria, Latifi qualified in sixth position. During the feature race, on his 24th birthday, Latifi was comfortably running in the points before teammate Sette Câmara spun him round and fell to 19th. Latifi made a stirring recovery drive to finish ninth. Latifi mastered to sixth in the sprint race.

In Silverstone, Latifi started fourth in the feature race, and passed Sette Câmara on the first lap. He then duelled with Ghiotto mid-race after the pit stops, in which Latifi led for a few laps. However, Latifi settled for second after unable to find a way past Ghiotto. It was Latifi's first podium since the third round. In the sprint race, Latifi worked his way to fifth.  By this point, De Vries had extended his championship lead to 21 points. In Hungary, Latifi qualified third, his first top 3 start of the season. He moved up to first place within the first few corners, passing Ghiotto and polesitter De Vries. He proceeded to take a dominant victory, which would be his final of the year. In the sprint race, Latifi secured seventh place. For the Spa-Francorchamps round, Latifi would have been set to start in 11th, with De Vries on pole. However, event was cancelled after lap 2 of the feature race, as a tragic accident claimed the life of Anthoine Hubert.

In Monza, Latifi qualified sixth. He battled for the podium places in the beginning but on lap 13 made contact with Guanyu Zhou, damaging Latifi's front wing. In the sprint race, Latifi had no pace capping off his point-less weekend in tenth. At this point with two rounds to go, Latifi was still in second place in the championship trailing De Vries by 59 points, and ahead of third-placed Ghiotto by just nine points. Latifi then stated that he would "focus on consolidating second in the championship". In Russia, Latifi had his best qualifying of the year, securing second alongside De Vries. He drove a clean feature race and finished second to De Vries, who had clinched the title with enough of a points gap. In the sprint race, Latifi drove a solid race and finished fifth. In the Yas Marina season finale, Latifi started seventh in the feature race, and finished in the same position. In the sprint race, Ghiotto passed him at the start. But Latifi was back in second after he passed Giuliano Alesi. He went on to finish second in his final F2 race. Latifi ended the season with 214 points and as the championship runner-up to De Vries. He ended two places and 10 points ahead of teammate Sette Câmara, and helped DAMS claimed the teams' title. Latifi also achieved four wins, four other podium finishes and four fastest laps.

Formula One 
Latifi was signed as Renault's new test driver for the 2016 season. He drove a Formula One car for the first time in a test in May of that year, completing 140 laps at Silverstone in the Renault-powered Lotus E20. His first test in an in-use Formula One car came on one year later at the post-race test at the Circuit de Barcelona-Catalunya, driving the Renault R.S.17 and completing 141 laps. He later tested again for the team at the Hungaroring.

Latifi was announced as a Force India test and reserve driver for the 2018 season. He first tested the Force India VJM11 after the Spanish Grand Prix, and racked up a total of 107 laps. He made his Grand Prix weekend debut with the team during the first practice session (FP1) of his home race in Canada, where he clocked a time of 1.17.145, which was 19th fastest. Latifi had another F1 test, after the Hungarian Grand Prix. Latifi added four more practice sessions at the German, Russian, Mexican and Brazilian Grands Prix.

For the 2019 season Latifi joined Williams as a test and reserve driver. He made his testing debut with Williams at the Bahrain International Circuit, and there was more testing to follow at the Circuit de Barcelona-Catalunya. He participated in six FP1 sessions that year, at the Canadian, French, Belgian, Mexican, United States and Brazilian Grands Prix. Latifi also took part in the 2019 post-season testing at the Yas Marina Circuit.

Williams (2020–2022)

2020 season 

Latifi joined Williams as a race driver for the  season, replacing Robert Kubica and partnering former Formula 2 competitor George Russell. Latifi raced under an American license in 2020 after Canada's national sporting authority resigned its mandate from the FIA. However, Latifi is still officially recognised as Canadian on race weekends. Latifi's race number is 6, chosen as a reference to a nickname of his home city, Toronto. It was also the same number he used on his DAMS F2 car.

Latifi was due to make his Formula One debut at the season-opening . He was entered into the race, however, it was later cancelled in response to the COVID-19 pandemic. His debut instead came at the  where it did not go so smoothly at first. He crashed in Free practice 3 (FP3) but his car was able to be fixed in time for qualifying, and secured last on the grid in 20th. However, Latifi finished the race in 11th place after nine other cars retired during the race. He made a good start in the race and ran as high as tenth before his pit stop. However, he was released into the path of Carlos Sainz Jr. after his pit stop and suffered a puncture on his rear-left tyre. Latifi had a spin on lap 43 later in the race, and eventually finished the race five laps behind the leaders.

He finished the race in 15th, and following the race, stated that he made his "first legit overtake in Formula 1", doing so on Kimi Räikkönen.

He made a two-stop during the race to finish 16th, ahead of Kevin Magnussen and only 2.8 seconds behind Charles Leclerc's Ferrari. In the race, Latifi pitted just before Magnussen stopped on track, and gained numerous positions as the pit entry was closed during a safety car period. A red flag saw Latifi line up in ninth position before the race restart. He lost places to both Renaults at the start and Daniil Kvyat would follow suit. In the final few laps, Latifi overtook Räikkönen on worn tyres to finish 11th, matching his joint-best result. Latifi also finished ahead of five other cars including teammate Russell. At the  Latifi qualified 19th and he was eliminated in a multi-car accident at the safety car restart. This marked his first Formula One retirement. 

However, an engine saw him demoted to the back of the grid. He went on to finish 16th in the race, beating Russell. After a late safety car, Latifi recorded another 11th place finish, finishing less than a second behind Antonio Giovinazzi.

He spun on the first lap having started from the pits and struggled for pace in the race. His race ended when he collided with Romain Grosjean, who was trying to unlap him. He also outqualified a Formula 1 teammate for the first time, beating Jack Aitken, who was substituting for Russell. While running in 13th place ahead of both Alfa Romeo and Haas cars, an oil leak capped saw his race came to a premature end. The final round at Abu Dhabi saw Latifi qualify last, having spun whilst preparing for his flying lap. He finished his race in 17th, ahead of both Haas drivers. Latifi ended his debut season 21st in the drivers' championship, the lowest of all full-time drivers. Additionally, both him and the Williams team failed to score points.

2021 season 

Williams retained Latifi alongside George Russell for the  season. During the season-opening , Latifi qualified 17th and retired in the race with a turbocharger issue. He did not finish the race after spinning on lap 1, and moments later collided with Nikita Mazepin. On the incident, Latifi only realised Mazepin had tagged him through the TV replay.

For his first ever , Latifi sported a one-off helmet in Williams' 750th race. Having started 18th, he finished the race in 15th place whilst "dehydrated" and "[forgetting] to connecting drinks tube". He finished the race in 13th place, but was given a 30-second penalty for not going through the pit lane despite being instructed to do so. He was re-classified 16th. In a race with zero retirements, Latifi struggled to 18th place only ahead of both Haas drivers. At the Styrian Grand Prix, Latifi qualified 16th for the third race in a row, missing out by 33 thousandths of a second. He was hit by Pierre Gasly at the start, which caused a rear-right puncture in Latifi's tyre. Having to cope with blue flags, Latifi finished 17th.

Latifi capitalised on a first-lap incident saw him as high as third, after the race restart. He would eventually be overtaken by faster cars but eventually finish eighth, just ahead of teammate Russell. However, Latifi was promoted to seventh after Sebastian Vettel was disqualified over a fuel issue, scoring his first F1 points and describing his feelings as "super happy".

At the Belgian Grand Prix, Latifi followed his success from Hungary with a 12th place in qualifying. He was promoted to tenth following penalties for Valtteri Bottas and Lando Norris but started ninth after Sergio Pérez crashed on his reconnaissance lap. With the race run entirely behind the safety car, Latifi was classified ninth, whilst teammate Russell finished second meaning Williams scored a double points finish for the second consecutive race. This race would be Latifi's final points finish of the season. However during a flying lap, Latifi lost control of his car and shunted into the wall, qualifying 14th. However, Latifi would be relegated to start from the pit lane due to change car components overnight. During the race, Latifi finished 17th, after struggling with tyres in the end.

In the race, Latifi was running in tenth place after the safety car restart but lost out to Esteban Ocon, finishing 11th.
At the Russian Grand Prix, Latifi qualified 14th but started 18th due to an engine penalty. He got stuck behind Nikita Mazepin for a while and retired on lap 47 with accident damage after colliding with the wall.

Latifi had incident-packed and uncompetitive races at the Turkish, United States and Mexico City Grands Prix, finishing 17th, 15th and 17th respectively. He finished the sprint and the race in the same position. 

At the season ending Abu Dhabi Grand Prix, Latifi was running 16th and last whilst battling with Mick Schumacher when he crashed out of the race on lap 53, causing the safety car to be deployed. A controversial decision taken during the safety car period by race director Michael Masi allowed Max Verstappen, who was running in second place before the crash, to overtake leader Lewis Hamilton and win both the race and the World Drivers' Championship. Latifi subsequently apologized for the incident, for which he was the target of threats and hate messages from fans on social media. On 21 December, he released a statement on his website addressing the online abuse he received, which he described as "shocking – and something I am calling out."

2022 season 

Latifi stayed with Williams for the 2022 season, alongside a new teammate, former Red Bull driver Alex Albon.

He lacked pace and finished 16th, only ahead of Nico Hülkenberg. Stroll was given a penalty for the incident. He finished 16th in the race, struggling for pace. By this point Latifi had yet to finish higher than 16th place while teammate Albon had scored a point. This saw Williams team boss Jost Capito to "rebuilt [his] confidence".

The  saw him finish 16th, the first time he finished ahead of Albon as teammates. Latifi crashed on the formation lap of the Monaco Grand Prix, but managed to start the race, which he finished in 15th. After the race, Carlos Sainz accused Latifi of costing him the victory by holding him up under blue flags. At his first home , Latifi crossed the line in 16th place. Due to poor performances, Latifi was rumoured to be replaced by 2021 F2 champion Oscar Piastri following the Canadian Grand Prix, but Capito declined that statement.

Latifi reached the third qualifying session (Q3) for the first time at the British Grand Prix, qualifying tenth. He improved to eighth at the start, but suffered floor damage later and eventually finished 12th. At the Hungarian Grand Prix, Latifi topped the final practice session in wet conditions. However, he set the 20th fastest (and slowest) time of qualifying having made a mistake at the final corner of the Hungaroring on his final attempt in Q1 despite being fastest through the first sector. Front wing damage compromised the start of his race, and he finished just behind Albon in 18th place.

On lap 2 of the race, Latifi spun and tagged Valtteri Bottas which knocked the Alfa Romeo driver out of the race. Latifi pitted for repairs and finished the race a lap down, in 18th place.

At the Italian Grand Prix, teammate Albon was forced to withdraw from the weekend following FP2 due to appendicitis. This meant that Latifi's teammate for the qualifying session and Grand Prix was Nyck de Vries, who beat him to the F2 title in 2019. De Vries reached Q2 in the qualifying session, whilst Latifi didn't get out of Q1, missing a chicane on his final run. In the race, De Vries scored points, finishing ninth, whilst Latifi finished 15th. This meant that De Vries went ahead of Latifi in the Drivers' Championship. At the Singapore Grand Prix, Latifi started last and his race ended on lap 7 when he collided with Zhou Guanyu, which caused a puncture for Latifi and ultimately his retirement from the race.

Having qualified last in Japan, Latifi pitted for intermediate tyres at the end of a safety car restart, and narrowly lost to Sebastian Vettel in the pit stops. It would be the right gamble, exiting in eighth. He held off Lando Norris to claim ninth place, and his first points of the season whilst describing it as a "nice reward". His result lifted him from 21st to 20th in the drivers' championship. He later suffered a technical issue and retired. Latifi ended the drivers' championship 20th in the championship with two points.

Latifi left Williams at the end of the 2022 season after spending three seasons with the team and was replaced by F2 graduate Logan Sargeant.

Karting record

Karting career summary

Racing record

Racing career summary

Complete Italian Formula Three Championship results 
(key) (Races in bold indicate pole position) (Races in italics indicate fastest lap)

Complete Toyota Racing Series results 
(key) (Races in bold indicate pole position) (Races in italics indicate fastest lap)

Complete FIA Formula 3 European Championship results
(key) (Races in bold indicate pole position) (Races in italics indicate fastest lap)

† Driver did not finish the race, but was classified as he completed over 90% of the race distance.

Complete Macau Grand Prix results

Complete Formula Renault 3.5 Series results
(key) (Races in bold indicate pole position) (Races in italics indicate fastest lap)

Complete GP2 Series results
(key) (Races in bold indicate pole position) (Races in italics indicate fastest lap)

Complete FIA Formula 2 Championship results
(key) (Races in bold indicate pole position) (Races in italics indicate fastest lap)

Complete Formula One results
(key) (Races in bold indicate pole position) (Races in italics indicate fastest lap)

** Latifi was entered as third driver, but this was reversed ahead of the session.
 Did not finish the Grand Prix but was classified, as he completed more than 90% of the race distance.
 Half points awarded as less than 75% of race distance was completed.

References

External links
 
 
 

1995 births
Living people
Sportspeople from Montreal
Sportspeople from North York
Anglophone Quebec people
Racing drivers from Ontario
Racing drivers from Quebec
Canadian people of Iranian descent
Sportspeople of Iranian descent
Italian Formula Three Championship drivers
Toyota Racing Series drivers
British Formula Three Championship drivers
FIA Formula 3 European Championship drivers
World Series Formula V8 3.5 drivers
GP2 Series drivers
FIA Formula 2 Championship drivers
Porsche Carrera Cup GB drivers
Canadian Formula One drivers
Williams Formula One drivers
BVM Target drivers
Carlin racing drivers
Prema Powerteam drivers
Tech 1 Racing drivers
Hilmer Motorsport drivers
Arden International drivers
MP Motorsport drivers
DAMS drivers
JD Motorsport drivers
Canadian sportspeople of Italian descent